The North Barlow River is a river in the West Coast Region of New Zealand's South Island. It is one of the headwaters of the Barlow River.

See also
List of rivers of New Zealand

References

Rivers of the West Coast, New Zealand
Rivers of New Zealand
Westland District